Lucio Norberto Mansilla (April 2, 1789 – April 10, 1871) was an Argentine soldier and politician. He was the first governor of the Entre Ríos Province and fought in the battle of Vuelta de Obligado.

Early life
Lucio Mansilla was born in Buenos Aires on April 2, 1789, son of Andrés Ximénez de Mansilla and Eduarda María Bravo. Lucio Mansilla was the 7th generation of the Mansilla family living in the Americas.

He began his military career in 1806, during the British invasions of the Río de la Plata, under the command of Santiago de Liniers. He was part of the Gallegos regiment. He also fought in the 1807 invasions, in the combat of Miserere on June 2, and the actions of July 5 and 6. The Buenos Aires Cabildo allowed him to run a math school in 1809.

Mansilla, a widower, married Juan Manuel de Rosas' sister, Agustina Ortiz de Rozas. They had six children: Lucio Victorio Mansilla, Eduarda, Lucio Norberto, Agustina and Carlos.

War of independence

Mansilla joined the forces of José Gervasio Artigas in 1812, against the Portuguese armies summoned by the royalist Javier de Elío. When Artigas left the siege before the Second Banda Oriental campaign, he joined José Rondeau. He was shot on May 12, 1813, during the attack to the fortress "El Quilombo", and joined back the siege when his injury healed. He was rewarded by Buenos Aires for his military actions.

He joined the Army of the Andes in 1814, and fought in the battles of Chacabuco and Talcahuano, under the command of José de San Martín. He also fought the decisive battle of Maipú under the command of Juan Gregorio de Las Heras. He was rewarded by both Argentina and Chile for his actions, and returned to Buenos Aires.

Entre Ríos

Francisco Ramírez called Mansilla to mediate between him and Artigas. When Artigas invaded Entre Ríos, he joined forces with Ramírez against him. He had an important role at the battle of Las Tunas. The conflict between Ramírez and Artigas led to the exile of Artigas in Paraguay. Ramírez declared the independence of the Republic of Entre Ríos and incorporated Corrientes and Misiones to it. Mansilla opposed these actions, and denied the help of his army. Ramírez died in an ambush, and the Republic of Entre Ríos was abolished and reincorporated into Argentina. Mansilla was appointed governor, as he was the commander of the only military unit in the area. He ended the hostilities between Entre Ríos and the Santa Fe Province. He ruled for three years and signed the Quadrilateral Treaty.

War with Brazil

Mansilla became a general in 1826, and marched to the Argentine-Brazilian War under the command of Carlos María de Alvear, operating at Rio Grande Do Sul. He led the siege of Montevideo, and played an important role in the battle of Camacuá. He defeated the Brazilian cavalry at the battle of Ombú, and fought in the battle of Ituzaingó.

Civil War
Mansilla refused to join the coup of Juan Lavalle against the governor Manuel Dorrego in 1828. Lavalle was ousted from power some time later, and Juan José Viamonte appointed him head of the police of Buenos Aires, once the Federals returned to power. He joined the military again with the War of the Confederation, and moved to Tucumán. He did not take action during the campaign of Lavalle against Juan Manuel de Rosas during the French blockade of the Río de la Plata, because Rosas was his brother-in-law (Mansilla married the sister of Rosas, Marina Agustina Dominga del Corazón de Jesús Ortiz de Rozas y López de Osornio on April 2, 1831) and Lavalle his comrade in arms during the War of Brazil.

Anglo-French blockade of the Río de la Plata

Britain and France began a war against Argentina, on behalf of the Colorados of Uruguay, as Argentina supported in Blancos in the Uruguayan Civil War. An Anglo-French navy sought to navigate the Paraná River, and Mansilla was appointed to the defense. He prepared the defense at Vuelta de Obligado, closing the river with chains, and prepared several artilleries, defended by 2000 men. However, the artillery had a lower range, precision and reload speed than the cannons of the ships. The battle of Vuelta de Obligado harmed a number of ships, but the navy prevailed after a couple of hours. Mansilla led a charge against French soldiers that tried to land and dismantle the artillery, being hurt in the chest and leaving Juan Bautista Thorne in command. The Argentine cavalry forced the French to return to their ships, but a second attack by both French and British had better success. The battle ended with 250 deaths and 400 injured for Argentina, and 26 deaths and 86 injured for the Anglo-French navy.

Mansilla prepared a new resistance at Quebracho, when the navy attempted to return to Montevideo. This attack gave serious damage to the ships.

Mansilla died in Buenos Aires on April 10, 1871, during an epidemic of Yellow Fever in the city.

References

Bibliography

 

1871 deaths
Argentine generals
Governors of Entre Ríos Province
Federales (Argentina)
1792 births
Burials at La Recoleta Cemetery